Fidelity Investments, commonly referred to as Fidelity, earlier as Fidelity Management & Research or FMR, is an American multinational financial services corporation based in Boston, Massachusetts. The company was established in 1946 and is one of the largest asset managers in the world with $4.5 trillion in assets under management, now as of December 2021 their assets under administration amounts to $11.8 trillion. Fidelity Investments operates a brokerage firm, manages a large family of mutual funds, provides fund distribution and investment advice, retirement services, index funds, wealth management, securities execution and clearance, asset custody, and life insurance.

History

The "Fidelity Fund" became Fidelity Investments under  Edward C. Johnson II; incorporated in Massachusetts, May 1, 1930. During the Great Depression, the "Fidelity Fund" was the only fund approved by 
John C. Hull in his term in office as Securities Director for Massachusetts because of widespread  bank failures in 1930. The corporate structure changed in 1946; it is  now known as Fidelity Management & Research (FMR).

In 1969, the company formed Fidelity International Limited (FIL) to serve non-U.S. markets and subsequently spun it off in 1980 into an independent entity owned by its employees.

In 1982, FMR company started offering 401(k) products. In 1984, it offered computerized stock trading.

In 1997, Robert Pozen was named CEO.

In 2001, Geode Capital Management was established to run and incubate investment strategies for FMR. In 2003, it was spun off as an independent company.

In 2003, the company launched its first ETF, called the Fidelity Nasdaq Composite Index Tracking Stock Fund (ONEQ).

In 2010, Fidelity Ventures, its venture capital arm, was shut down, and many of the employees created Volition Capital.

In 2011, Fidelity changed the name of its international division from Fidelity International to Fidelity Worldwide Investment and a new logo was introduced.

In 2012, the company moved its Boston headquarters to 245 Summer Street.

In 2014, Abigail Johnson became president and CEO of Fidelity Investments (FMR) and chairman of Fidelity International (FIL).

In 2018, Fidelity launched a separate entity dedicated to institutional cryptoasset custody and cryptocurrency trading.

In May 2019, it was reported that the firm would soon be offering cryptocurrency trading to institutional customers.

In October 2019, the company launched Fidelity Digital Asset Services, which will handle cryptocurrency custody and trade execution for institutional investors. Subsequently, in March 2021, Fidelity filed for introducing a Bitcoin ETF with the SEC.

Fidelity's assets under management climbed 26% in 2019 to a record $3.2 trillion, which helped boost revenue to $20.9 billion and operating income to $6.9 billion.

In March 2020, Fidelity opened a new investor center in Chesnut Hill, MA.

In March 2021, FMR's operating income rose 4.6%. In August 2021, Fidelity announced plans to hire 16,000 employees in 2021, including 9,000 during the second half of the year.

In April 2022, Fidelity Investments announced that it will start offering Bitcoin as an investment option, specifically in its 401(k) plans by the middle of the year. It is also the first major 401(k) provider to offer cryptocurrency as an investment for retirement savers, according to CNN. However, this option will only be offered to participants whose employers have elected to include it in their plan, as of now.

Current operations

Mutual funds
In the 1960s, Fidelity was the first major American finance firm to market mutual funds directly to everyday people via direct mail advertising and door to door sales. Previously, mutual funds had been marketed almost exclusively to high-income or high-wealth individuals, retirement funds for employers, and/or those already in the finance industry.

FMR has three fund divisions: Equity (headquartered in Boston, Massachusetts), High-Income (headquartered in Boston) and Fixed-Income (headquartered in Merrimack, New Hampshire). The company's largest equity mutual fund is Fidelity Contrafund, which has $107.4 billion in assets, making it the largest non-indexed fund in the U.S. and the largest fund managed by an individual. William Danoff has managed Contrafund since 1990.

Fidelity Magellan is another large equity fund, with $15.5 billion in assets. Its current manager is Jeffrey Feingold, who also manages the Fidelity Trend Fund. It was previously managed by Ned Johnson from May 2, 1963, to Dec. 31, 1971, Peter Lynch from May 31, 1977, to May 31, 1990, and Harry W. Lange from 2005 to 2012. Under Lynch's leadership Magellan averaged 29% a year, more than doubling the growth rate of the benchmark S&P 500, and remains the best-performing mutual fund in history over such an extended period.

In 2018, Fidelity Investments introduced a new line of zero-expense-ratio mutual funds for individual investors. Fidelity's first two zero expense ratio funds, ZERO Total Market Index Fund and ZERO International Index Fund have since grown to more than $1 billion in assets. Later that year, Fidelity introduced two more zero-expense funds. Together, the four Fidelity zero-expense-ratio equity funds provide market exposure to more than two-thirds of industry index assets.

Brokerage
Fidelity Investments operates a major brokerage firm and has investor centers in over 140 locations throughout the U.S. Through its subsidiary, National Financial Services LLC, Fidelity Investments provides services to its correspondent broker-dealers, institutional investment firms, banks and trusts, family offices, and registered investment advisors including brokerage clearing and back office support and a suite of software products for financial services firms. National Financial was the custodian for over $443 billion in assets, in 4.3 million accounts as of September 30, 2010.

Benefits outsourcing
Fidelity Personal, Workplace and Institutional Services (PWIS) is the largest provider of 401(k) retirement plan services with $1.4 trillion under administration and $32 billion in total defined contribution assets, as of 2015. Other services provided include pension administration, health & welfare administration, stock plan administration as well as payroll and other record-keeping services.

Devonshire Investors
The company's Devonshire Investors arm is a division that gives the owners of the company the ability to make other investments outside its funds.

Assets include Veritude, an employment agency for jobs at Fidelity. The company has been a major investor of real estate, owning the Seaport Center and 2.5 million square feet of office space in Boston. It formerly owned Community Newspaper Company, the largest chain of newspapers in suburban Boston, Massachusetts, sold to the Boston Herald in 2000 and now owned by GateHouse Media. Fidelity has also strategically invested in the telecom/managed services/data center industries, including COLT Telecom Group in Europe, MetroRED in South America, and KVH Co. Ltd. in Japan. Since 2008, all MetroRED ownership has been completely divested.

It was formerly heavily invested in commercial lumber and building materials.

In 2013, they sold Boston Coach, a limousine and black-car service, founded in 1985 by Ned Johnson after waiting too long for a taxi, to Harrison Global. It formed ProBuild Holdings in 2006 and sold it to Builders FirstSource in 2015.

Donor-advised fund 
Fidelity manages a Donor-Advised Fund (DAF), Fidelity Charitable, in 1991, becoming the first commercial DAF provider.

Eight Roads 
Fidelity International (FIL) also runs its own proprietary investing arm called Eight Roads. It is a global platform with 100+ investment professionals across China, Japan, India, Singapore and UK. In 2018, Eight Roads launched a new European fund. In June 2019, Fidelity announced it may demerge Eight Roads from its core business.

Investigation about insiders' private investments

A private venture capital firm, F-Prime Capital Partners, managed on behalf of owners and other key leaders of Fidelity Investments, has been described as directly competing with Fidelity Investments public funds. A 2016 Reuters investigation identified multiple cases where F-Prime Capital Partners  was able to make investments at a fraction of the price of Fidelity Investments. Because of SEC regulations, investments by F-Prime Capital Partners preclude Fidelity from making the same early investments. The investigation describes that this competition forces Fidelity to delay investing until later and at much higher prices than F-Prime Capital Partners, resulting in lower returns for Fidelity fund shareholders.

Corporate governance experts have stated that the practice is not illegal, but that it poses a clear corporate conflict of interest. Fidelity spokesmen have stated that they are following all laws and regulations.

The same Reuters investigation documents six cases (out of 10) where Fidelity Investments became one of the largest investors of F-Prime Capital companies after the start-up companies became publicly traded. Legal and academic experts said that major investments by Fidelity mutual funds - with their market-moving buying power - could be seen as propping up the values of the F-Prime Capital investments, to the benefit of Fidelity insiders.

Fidelity declined to comment on this aspect of the investigation.

Legal issues

Document retention fines
In February 2007, the NASD, a division of the Financial Industry Regulatory Authority, fined four FMR-affiliated broker-dealers $3.75 million for alleged registration, supervision and e-mail retention violations. The broker-dealers settled without admitting or denying the charges.

In 2004, Fidelity Brokerage paid $2 million to settle charges by the U.S. Securities and Exchange Commission that employees altered and destroyed documents in 21 of its 88 branch offices between January 2001 and July 2002. Fidelity has internal inspections every year to make sure it is complying with federal regulations. Management was accused of pressuring branch employees to have perfect inspections and gave notice of the inspections and that at least 62 employees destroyed or altered potentially improper documents maintained at branch offices including new account applications, letters of authorization and variable annuity forms.

Misrepresentations
In May 2007, NASD fined two Fidelity broker-dealers $400,000 for preparing and distributing misleading sales literature promoting Fidelity's Destiny I and II Systematic Investment Plans, which were sold primarily to U.S. military personnel. As part of the settlement, the FMR affiliates were required to notify Destiny Plan holders who want to increase their investments in existing Destiny Plans that additional shares of the underlying fund can be purchased outside the Destiny Plans without paying the additional sales charges.

Ownership and management

Johnson Family

The founding Johnson family, individually and through various trusts, owns stock representing a 49% voting interest in FMR, and have signed agreements pledging to vote all their shares as a bloc. Edward Johnson III was chairman of the group, but was replaced by his daughter, Abigail Johnson. Abigail was once the largest single shareholder with about 25% ownership, but in October 2005, it was reported that she had sold a "significant" portion of her shares to family trusts, and that there were doubts as to whether she was still in line to succeed her father. Abigail was named CEO in 2014, and chairman in 2016.

Employees and ex-employees

Most of the remaining 51% of the company is held by various Fidelity employees and ex-employees, including fund managers and ex-managers, such as Peter Lynch.

Offices
FMR's corporate headquarters are in Boston, Massachusetts, with the largest U.S. operations located in Merrimack, New Hampshire; Smithfield, Rhode Island; Westlake, Texas; Dallas, Texas; Houston, Texas; San Antonio, Texas; Mission Hills, Kansas;Covington, Kentucky; Durham, North Carolina; Albuquerque, New Mexico; Cincinnati, Ohio; Salt Lake City, Utah; Jacksonville, Florida; Greenwood Village, Colorado;
and American Fork, Utah. It also has offices in Canada in Toronto, Montreal, Calgary and Vancouver.
Fidelity Management and Research in 2009 opened offices in both Hong Kong and Tokyo, Japan to add capabilities to its small cap research.

In 2004, Fidelity established its first presence in India by opening an office in Mumbai. However, their offices in India mostly serve back-office function and do not make any investments related decisions. The company has over 4,000 employees in India. Its second largest software development facility (after the United States) is in Bangalore and Chennai.

Fidelity Investments Ireland was established in 1996 as the European offshore development centre for Fidelity Investments and now employs over 1,000 people with offices in Dublin and Galway. Fidelity also has offices in France, Germany, Belgium, Italy, Spain and Switzerland and London for its HR Solution business HR Access.

Marketing

Paul McCartney marketing campaign
Fidelity has experimented with marketing techniques directed to the baby boomer demographic, releasing Never Stop Doing What You Love, a compilation of songs by Paul McCartney. McCartney became the firm's spokesman in 2005 in a campaign entitled "This Is Paul". On the day of the disc's release, company employees were treated to a special recorded message by Paul himself informing them that "Fidelity and [he] have a lot in common" and urging them to "never stop doing what you love".

See also
 List of US mutual funds by assets under management
 Mutual funds:
 Fidelity Contrafund
 Fidelity Magellan
 Fidelity International
 List of mutual-fund families in the United States
 Mutual fund fees and expenses
 Wealth Lab
 Asset management in Singapore
 Merrill Lynch, Pierce, Fenner & Smith Inc. v. Manning, a 2016 Supreme Court case involving naked short selling claims against National Financial, a subsidiary of Fidelity, Merrill Lynch, and others.

References

External links
 

1946 establishments in Massachusetts
Companies based in Boston
American companies established in 1946
Financial services companies established in 1946
Financial services companies of the United States
Privately held companies of the United States
Investment management companies of the United States
Multinational companies headquartered in the United States
Mutual funds of the United States
Online brokerages
Online financial services companies of the United States
Privately held companies based in Massachusetts
Fidelity International

sah:Fidelity Investments